The Platinum Collection is the first compilation by Italian operatic pop trio Il Volo, released in Italy in February 2015 following their appearance at the 65th Sanremo Music Festival, in which their song "Grande amore" received first prize in the "Big Artists" category and will represent Italy in 2015 Eurovision Song Contest.  
The album debuted and peaked at No.13.

It contains three previously released albums, Il Volo (2010), We Are Love (2012) and Il Volo Takes Flight - Live from the Detroit Opera House (2012).

Track listing
Disc 1

 Disc 2

 Disc 3

Charts

Certifications

References

External links

Il Volo albums
2015 compilation albums